Melilotus, known as melilot, sweet clover, and kumoniga (from the Cumans), is a genus in the family Fabaceae (the same family that also includes the Trifolium clovers). Members are known as common grassland plants and as weeds of cultivated ground.  Originally from Europe and Asia, it is now found worldwide.

This legume is commonly named for its sweet smell, which is due to the presence of coumarin in its tissues. Coumarin, though responsible for the sweet smell of hay and newly mowed grass, has a bitter taste, and, as such, possibly acts as a means for the plant to discourage consumption by animals. Fungi (including Penicillium, Aspergillus, Fusarium, and Mucor) can convert coumarin into dicoumarol, a toxic anticoagulant. Consequently, dicoumarol may be found in decaying sweet-clover, and was the cause of the so-called sweet-clover disease, recognized in cattle in the 1920s. A few varieties of sweet clover have been developed with low coumarin content and are safer for forage and silage.

The name sweet clover varies orthographically (sweet-clover, sweetclover).

Uses
Melilotus species are eaten by the larvae of some Lepidoptera species, such as those of the genus Coleophora, including C. frischella and C. trifolii.

Melilotus, often used as a green manure, can be turned into the soil to increase its nitrogen and organic matter content. It is especially valuable in heavy soils because of its deep rooting. However, it may fail if the soil is too acidic. It should be turned into the soil when 8 to 10 inches tall. Unscarified seed is best sown in spring when the ground is not too dry; scarified seed is better sown in late fall or even in the snow, so it will germinate before competing weeds the following spring.

Melilotus siculus (messina) is notable for its high combined tolerance to salinity and water logging. As of 2019, the "Neptune" variety has the highest tolerance and persistence under salinity among all pasture legumes, according to the Australian Department of Primary Industries and Regional Development. The salt-tolerant symbioant Ensifer medicae SRDI554 is recommended.

Others
Blue melilot (Trigonella caerulea) is not a member of the genus, despite the name.

Species
The genus Melilotus currently has nineteen recognized species:

 Melilotus albus Medik. (white sweet clover)
 Melilotus altissimus Thuill. (tall yellow sweet clover)
 Melilotus dentatus (Waldst. & Kit.) Pers.
 Melilotus elegans Salzm. ex Ser.
 Melilotus hirsutus Lipsky
 Melilotus indicus (L.) All. (annual yellow sweet clover, Indian sweet clover)
 Melilotus infestus Guss.
 Melilotus italicus (L.) Lam.
 Melilotus macrocarpus Coss. & Durieu
 Melilotus officinalis (L.) Pall. (yellow sweet clover)
 Melilotus polonicus (L.) Desr.
 Melilotus segetalis (Brot.) Ser.
 Melilotus siculus (Turra) B. D. Jacks.
 Melilotus speciosus Durieu
 Melilotus spicatus (Sm.) Breistr.
 Melilotus suaveolens Ledeb.
 Melilotus sulcatus Desf. (Mediterranean sweet clover)
 Melilotus tauricus (M. Bieb.) Ser.
 Melilotus wolgicus Poir. (Volga sweet clover, Russian sweet clover)

References

Fabaceae genera
Medicinal plants
Nitrogen-fixing crops
Trifolieae
Taxa named by Philip Miller